Tilia kiusiana, the Kyushu lime, is a species of flowering plant in the family Malvaceae, native to southern and central Japan, and introduced to the Korean Peninsula. It has a number of features that make it "potentially the next great landscape tree", including small, narrow leaves that are not the typical linden shape, a refined growth habit, attractive exfoliating bark, aphid resistance, and slow growth to a medium size. Hardy to zone 6, it is available from commercial nurseries.

References

kiusiana
Endemic flora of Japan
Trees of Japan
Plants described in 1900